The Eleventh Texas Legislature met from August 6, 1866, to November 13, 1866, in its regular session. All members of the House of Representatives and about half of the members of the Senate were elected in 1865.

Sessions
11th Regular session: August 6–November 13, 1866

Party summary

Officers

Senate
 Lieutenant Governor George Washington Jones
 President pro tempore Robert Henry Guinn, Democrat

 Jones was removed from office in July 1867 by General Phillip H. Sheridan. The office of Lieutenant Governor remained vacant until 1870. Robert Henry Guinn served as acting Lieutenant Governor for the remainder of the term.

House of Representatives
 Speaker of the House  Nathaniel Macon Burford, Unionist

Members
Members of the Eleventh Texas Legislature at the beginning of the regular session, August 6, 1866:

Senate

House of Representatives
Representatives of the Eleventh Texas Legislature serving from 1866 to 1870:

Membership changes

Senate

External links

11 Texas Legislature
1866 in Texas
1866 U.S. legislative sessions